The 2014–15 season is the 70th season in Zadar’s history and their eighth in the Prva HNL. Their 7th place finish in the 2013–14 season means it is their 18th successive season playing in the Prva HNL. On December 2, 2014 the main chairman of NK Zadar Reno Sinovčić was arrested on grounds of corruption.

First-team squad

Competitions

Overall

Prva HNL

Classification

Results summary

Results by round

Matches

Prva HNL

Croatian Cup

Sources: Prva-HNL.hr

Friendlies

Player seasonal records
Competitive matches only. Updated to games played 15 December 2014.

Goals

Source: Sportnet.hr

Transfers

In

Out

Loans in

Loans out

References

2014-15
Croatian football clubs 2014–15 season